The Betty Boop Movie Mystery  (also known as Betty Boop's Hollywood Mystery) is a 1989 animated special starring Betty Boop.

Story
The  story is set in the 1930s, reflecting on the original Max Fleischer style of animation. Betty works as a waitress in a diner with her friends Bimbo the musical dog and Koko the Clown. Betty and her friends entertain the customers with a Hawaiian hula revue. The trio are seen entertaining the customers by Diner Dan who owns the diner; he gets very angry and fires Betty and her friends. While searching for a new job they bump into detective Sam Slade, who hires Betty and her pals to go undercover for him as musical detectives to keep an eye on Hollywood movie star Lola DaVille's diamond necklace. The lights go out and Lola's necklace is stolen. Betty is left holding the smoke gun, the police arrest Betty, and she is carted off to jail. Bimbo and Koko break Betty out of jail, then head over to Moolah Studios where they find out that Lola's secretary, Miss Green, was behind the robbery, and that her accomplice was the detective Sam Slade. The pursuit ends on a Busby Berkeley set, Lola DaVille receives her diamond necklace and Sam Slade and Miss Green are both arrested by the police. A singing telegram from Betty's old boss, Diner Dan, pleads Betty and her friends to return to the diner, to which Betty agrees. Betty then finishes the story by singing "You don't have to be star to be star," and says the best place to be is with your friends.

Cast
Melissa Fahn as Betty Boop
Lucille Bliss
Hamilton Camp as Maxwell Movieola
Jodi Carlisle
Michael Bell
William Farmer
Toby Gleason
Gregory Jones
John Stephenson
Randi Merzon
Roger Rose
James Ward

External links
 
 

1989 animated films
1989 television films
Films set in the 1930s
Betty Boop cartoons
1980s animated short films
1989 films
1980s American animated films
1980s English-language films